Nourah Al Saad is a Qatari writer and academic who was born in 1964 in Doha, Qatar.

Biography 
Nourah Al Saad received a Bachelor of Education from the Department of Arabic Language at Qatar University in 1985 and then a Master of Arts in the Department of Arabic Language from the University of Jordan in 1992.

Her articles have appeared in Al Raya newspaper.

Works 
 The Newspaper Soldier (collection of short stories), 1989
 And seek the truth (collection of articles), 2003
 Abd al-Rahman Munif’s Experience in Salt Cities (a critical study), 2005
 Voices of Silence: Essays on the Qatari Story and Narrative (Literary Criticism), 2005
 The Sun in My Archeology: Essays on Poetry and Criticism (Literary Criticism), 2007
 The Petition" (novel), 2011
 Paranoia (collection of short stories), 2013

References 

1964 births
Living people
Qatari writers